While Paris is encircled by the Boulevard Périphérique (Paris ring road), the city gates of Paris ("portes de Paris") are the access points to the city for pedestrians and other road users. As Paris has had successive ring roads through the centuries, city gates are found inside the modern-day Paris.

The city gates of today 

(List of city gates created during the extension of Paris in 1860 and which have left their mark on the city map. The gates are listed in clockwise sequence starting in the north at la Route Nationale 1.)

North-east

18e est 
 Porte de la Chapelle : route nationale 1, autoroute A1

19e 
 Porte d'Aubervilliers : route nationale 301
 Porte de la Villette : route nationale 2
 Porte de Pantin : route nationale 3
 Porte Chaumont
 Porte Brunet
 Porte du Pré-Saint-Gervais
 Porte des Lilas

East

20e 
 Porte des Lilas
 Porte de Ménilmontant
 Porte de Bagnolet : autoroute A3
 Porte de Montreuil : route nationale 302

12e 
 Porte de Vincennes : route nationale 34
 Porte Jaune
 Porte de Saint-Mandé
 Porte de Montempoivre
 Porte Dorée or "Porte de Picpus"
 Porte de Reuilly
 Porte de Charenton : route nationale 6
 Porte de Bercy : autoroute A4

South (rive gauche)

13e 
 Porte de la Gare
 Porte de Vitry
 Porte d'Ivry
 Porte de Choisy : route nationale 305
 Porte d'Italie : route nationale 7
 Poterne des Peupliers

14e 
 Porte de Gentilly
 Porte d'Arcueil
 Porte d'Orléans : route nationale 20
 Porte de Montrouge
 Porte de Châtillon
 Porte Didot
 Porte de Vanves

15e 
 Porte Brancion
 Porte de Plaisance
 Porte de la Plaine
 Porte de Versailles
 Porte d'Issy
 Porte de Sèvres

West

16e 
 Porte du Point-du-Jour
 Porte de Saint-Cloud : route nationale 10
 Porte Molitor
 Porte de Boulogne
 Porte de l'Hippodrome
 Porte d'Auteuil : autoroute A13
 Porte de Passy
 Porte de la Muette
 Porte Dauphine
 Porte de la Seine
 Porte de Madrid
 Porte Saint-James
 Porte de Neuilly
 Porte des Sablons

North-west

17e 
 Porte Maillot : route nationale 13
 Porte des Ternes
 Porte de Villiers
 Porte de Champerret
 Porte de Courcelles
 Porte d'Asnières
 Porte de Clichy
 Porte Pouchet

18e 
 Porte de Saint-Ouen
 Porte de Montmartre
 Porte de Clignancourt : route nationale 14
 Porte des Poissonniers

Ancient gates of Paris 

 Porte Saint-Denis along the trace of the enceinte of Charles V.
 Porte Saint-Martin along the trace of the enceinte of Charles V.
 Rue des Fossés-Saint-Bernard
 Rue des Fossés-Saint-Jacques
 Rue des Fossés-Saint-Marcel

After the construction of the Wall of the Farmers-General in 1785, the gates of Paris bore the names barriers (barrières) until 1860 (e.g. barrière de la Villette, barrière du Trône, barrière d'Italie, etc.) They were, in fact, toll gates used for collection of the octroi, an excise tax assessed on goods entering the city. Some of the toll booths built by Ledoux remain at:
 rotunda of the Place de Stalingrad
 Place du Trône
 Place Denfert-Rochereau (formerly barrière d'Enfer)

See also 
 Boulevards of the Marshals
 City walls of Paris
 Enceinte

Paris-related lists
Fortifications of Paris